Stits is a surname. Notable people with the surname include:

 Bill Stits (1931–2011), American football safety
 Ray Stits (1921–2015), American inventor, homebuilt aircraft designer, aircraft mechanic and pilot

See also
 Stitz, surname